The 2012 Oregon Secretary of State election was held on November 6, 2012, to elect the Oregon Secretary of State. Incumbent Democratic Secretary of State Kate Brown ran for a second term against Republican Knute Buehler. Brown and Buehler ran against each other again in the 2018 Oregon gubernatorial election.

Candidates

Democratic primary

Candidates 

 Kate Brown, incumbent
 Paul Damian Wells, machinist

Republican primary

Candidates 

 Knute Buehler, surgeon

Independent primary 
Oregon allows candidates to be cross-nominated by up to three political parties. The Independent Party of Oregon holds a month-long online primary to select which candidate receives their nomination. The party chose candidates in a number of legislative and local races but only one statewide race, Secretary of State.

Candidates 

 Kate Brown, incumbent
 Knute Buehler, surgeon

Other parties 

 Bruce Alexander Knight (Libertarian), store manager
 Robert Wolfe (Progressive), wine salesman
 Seth Woolley (Pacific Green), software engineer

Polling

Results

References 

2012 Oregon elections
Oregon Secretary of State elections
Oregon
November 2012 events in the United States